"Like We Never Loved At All" is a song recorded by American country music singer Faith Hill.  It was released in August 2005 as the second from her album Fireflies.  The song features her husband Tim McGraw singing harmony vocals. Like two other singles from the album — "Mississippi Girl" and "Sunshine and Summertime" — this song was co-written by John Rich of Big & Rich, Vicky McGehee and Scot Sax.

A tale of coping with a love that has drifted away, the song provided the thematic opening for shows from McGraw and Hill's joint Soul2Soul II Tour 2006, with the pair singing it at opposite ends of the stage and with their backs to each other.

The song was a success on both country and adult contemporary radios. It became a Top 5 hit on the Billboard Hot Country Songs and a Top 10 hit on the Billboard Adult Contemporary chart.

Hill and McGraw won the Grammy Award for Best Country Collaboration with Vocals for the song, at the 48th Annual Grammy Awards, in 2006.

Music video
A music video was released in conjunction with the song, directed by Sophie Muller. In it, Hill and McGraw are portrayed as a country music duo in the 1960s (named Jackie and Isaac), who are moving on from a romance they once shared. After the first chorus, Hill leaves the set in distress, retreating to her private room. McGraw follows, and knocks on her door. Inconveniently, his girlfriend arrives and embraces him just as Hill opens the door. Seeing this, she slams it shut again, throwing things around in a fit of aggravation. Later, Hill and McGraw are at a restaurant with various guests, sitting at separate tables. As McGraw is about to stand up, possibly to talk to Hill, her new fiancé announces to everyone that he wants to marry her, presenting her with a diamond ring. Heartbroken, McGraw walks over to the bar to intoxicate himself. Hill refuses the proposal by shutting the ring box, which McGraw does not see. The couple is also seen performing in front of a red stage. McGraw wears a suit and Hill wears a yellow dress in these scenes.

Personnel
Compiled from liner notes.
 Bruce Bouton — steel guitar
 Tom Bukovac — electric guitar
 Paul Bushnell — bass guitar
 Stuart Duncan — fiddle
 Shannon Forrest — drums
 Dann Huff — electric guitar
 Charlie Judge — keyboards

Chart performance
The song debuted at number 51 on the U.S. Billboard Hot Country Songs on the week ending August 13, 2005.

Year-end charts

References 

2005 singles
2005 songs
Faith Hill songs
Tim McGraw songs
Songs written by John Rich
Song recordings produced by Dann Huff
Music videos directed by Sophie Muller
Country ballads
Warner Records singles
Songs written by Vicky McGehee
Male–female vocal duets